WMUK is a non profit public radio station at 102.1 FM in Kalamazoo, Michigan. Owned and operated by Western Michigan University, WMUK broadcasts at an effective radiated power of 50,000 watts. WMUK is a charter member of both National Public Radio and the Michigan Public Radio Network. The station is also an affiliate of Public Radio International.

WMUK provides a mix of local and syndicated programming - a complete schedule can be found on their website.

WMUK is one of the two local Kalamazoo radio stations broadcasting in HD Radio; the other is WKFR. It also operates an HD2 side channel with a classical music format as WMUK Classical, which is simulcast on Kalamazoo Public Schools-owned WKDS 89.9 FM. 

In January 2020, WMUK eliminated classical music programming from its daytime schedule and became a full news/talk station during the day, with jazz continuing overnights. In addition to the already-running news programs Morning Edition, All Things Considered, As It Happens and Marketplace, WMUK added On Point, The Takeaway, 1A, Fresh Air and The Daily to its weekday schedule. Classical music programming moved to WMUK-HD2 and WKDS.

References

Sources
Michiguide.com - WMUK History

External links

MUK
Western Michigan University
NPR member stations
Public Radio International stations
Radio stations established in 1951
MUK
1951 establishments in Michigan
News and talk radio stations in the United States